Linda Goupil (born May 13, 1961 in Saint-Léon-de-Standon, Quebec) is a former Canadian politician, who represented the electoral district of Lévis in the National Assembly of Quebec from 1998 to 2003. First elected in the 1998 provincial election, she sat as a member of the Parti Québécois caucus, and served in the Executive Council of Quebec as Minister of Justice from 1998 to 2001.

She was defeated by Carole Théberge of the Quebec Liberal Party in the 2003 election. She ran again in the 2007 election, in which she and Théberge were both defeated by Christian Lévesque of the Action démocratique du Québec.

Goupil ran in the 2014 provincial election in the neighbouring district of Bellechasse, but was not reelected to the legislature.

Electoral record

|-

|Liberal
|Carole Théberge
|align="right"|12,891
|align="right"|35.12
|align="right"|-0.05

|-

|-

|Liberal
|Carole Théberge
|align="right"|9,925
|align="right"|25.19
|align="right"| -9.92
|-

|-

|-

References

External links
 

Parti Québécois MNAs
Living people
Women MNAs in Quebec
People from Chaudière-Appalaches
Members of the Executive Council of Quebec
1961 births
21st-century Canadian politicians
21st-century Canadian women politicians
Women government ministers of Canada